The following is a list of neighborhoods in the Municipality of Anchorage, Alaska, United States. The "Anchorage Bowl" is the area normally thought of simply as Anchorage. Other areas within the Municipality are located along the Glenn and Seward highways running north and south from Anchorage respectively. These are separate communities despite being under the Anchorage municipal government, some being as far as 40 miles (64 km) from the central Anchorage bowl.

 Anchorage Bowl
 Abbott Loop
 Airport Heights
 Bayshore
 Boniface
 Bragaw
 Campbell Park
 Dimond
 Downtown Anchorage
 Fairview
 Government Hill
 Green Acres
 Hillside
 Lake Otis
 Little Fairbanks
 Midtown
 Mountain View
 Muldoon
 North Star
 Nunaka Valley
 Oceanview
 O' Malley
 Rogers Park
 Russian Jack
 Sand Lake
 South Addition
 Spenard
 Stuckagain Heights
 Tudor
 Turnagain
 University-Medical District
 North of central Anchorage
 Birchwood
 Chugiak
 Eagle River
 Eklutna
 Peters Creek
South of central Anchorage
 Bird
 Girdwood
 Indian
Rabbit Creek
 Rainbow

External links
 Federation of Community Councils

 
Neighborhoods